Ron Dorsey may refer to:

 Ron Dorsey (basketball, born 1948), American former professional basketball player who was drafted in the 13th round of the 1971 NBA draft
 Ron Dorsey (basketball, born 1983), American professional basketball player who has played in Europe, Australia and New Zealand